Orleans station was a train station in Orleans, Massachusetts. It was built by the Old Colony Railroad in 1865 when the rail line was extended from Yarmouth to Orleans. The original station was replaced by a newer station around 1890. Passenger service to this station ended in the late 1930s when the New Haven Railroad discontinued scheduled service between Yarmouth and Provincetown.

References

External links

Orleans, Massachusetts
Old Colony Railroad Stations on Cape Cod
Stations along Old Colony Railroad lines
Former railway stations in Massachusetts